MOPA may refer to:
 Master oscillator power amplifier, a type of laser system
 Mopa - a village in Goa, India
 Mopa, Nigeria, a town in Kogi State
 Museum of Photographic Arts
 Month of Photography Asia